Asaba 2022 Sports Festival also known as the National Sports Festival of Nigeria is a biennial multi-sport event organized by the Federal Government of Nigeria through the National Sports Commission for athletes from the 36 States and the Federal Capital Territory of Nigeria.

History
The National Sport Festival can be traced back to its debut in 1973 in Lagos State. The major aim of the festival is fooster unity and ensure talent development in sports in the country.

The festival is also known to be called Nigerias version of Olympics games. The festival for 2022 was the 21st edition of the competition and it was hosted at the Stephen Keshi Stadium in Asaba, the capital of Delta state.

Festival activities
The National Sport Festival tagged Asaba 2022 was scheduled to hold from November 8, 2022, to December 10, 2022. The flag off of the Torch of Unity for the festival was done by President Muhammadu Buhari at the Presidential villa in Abuja.

The Governor of Delta State, Dr. Ifeanyi Okowa received the torch of Unity from the Minister of Youth and Sports Development, Sunday Dare after the troch of Unity had toured the entire 36 states of the federation including the Federal Capital Territory.

Some of the activities in the festival includes running, scrabble games, basketball, handball, volleyball, swimming, cycling, wrestling, judo, Karate, kickboxing, cricket and many other sports included in the olympics games. It was reported that over 15,00 athletics participated in the festival in Asaba.

Host selection
Delta state won the bid to host this years version of the festival at the end of the last edition which was held in Benin city, Edo State.

Tournament medal table
At the end of the 21st edition, team Delta topped the medal table winning 320 gold medal, 200 silver medals and 128 bronze medals.

Team Bayelsa came second in the medal table followed by Team Edo which came third in the medal table.

References

2022 in Nigerian sport
Sports competitions in Nigeria